"Seven Seas of Rhye" is a song by the British rock band Queen. It was primarily written by Freddie Mercury, with Brian May contributing the second middle-eight. The song is officially credited to Mercury only. A rudimentary instrumental version appears as the final track on the group's self-titled debut album (1973), with the final version on the follow-up Queen II (1974).

The completed version served as the band's third single, and after performing the song on the BBC's Top of the Pops in February 1974 it became their first hit, reaching number 10 on the UK Singles Chart. It is the earliest-released song to appear on their Greatest Hits album, with the exception of some versions where their first single, "Keep Yourself Alive", is included. "Seven Seas of Rhye" is inspired by the fantasy world of Freddie Mercury and his sister, Kashimara Bulsara when they were children.

Background
Initially "Seven Seas of Rhye" was simply an "instrumental musical sketch closing their first album". An expanded rendition, planned to be included on the album Queen II, was publicly premiered when Queen was offered a sudden chance to appear on the BBC's Top of the Pops in February 1974, and was rushed to vinyl two days later on 23 February.  It became their first chart entry after gaining airtime on BBC Radio 1, peaking at number 10 on the UK Singles Chart, which in turn persuaded Freddie Mercury to take up Queen as his full-time career.

Style, construction and interpretation
The song features a distinctive arpeggiated piano introduction.

The version on Queen II ends with a cross fade, instruments blending into the band singing "I Do Like to Be Beside the Seaside", accompanied by a stylophone played by Roy Thomas Baker, which was a sole exception to their "no synths" statement. Its inclusion here on the final track of Queen II is briefly mirrored via whistling during the first few seconds of "Brighton Rock", which opens their next album, Sheer Heart Attack.

In a 1977 radio interview, Mercury described the subject of the song as a "figment of his imagination". In the Queen musical We Will Rock You, the Seven Seas of Rhye is a place where the Bohemians are taken after they are brain-drained by Khashoggi.

Reception
Cash Box called it a "high energy rocker with Led Zeppelin overtones," stating that "the group's extraordinary talents are perfectly displayed here in heavy metal fashion." Record World said that Queen's "'rock in the royal tradition' is looking for its own top 40 chart crown."

Live performances
The song was dropped from the live set in 1976 and was not played in concert again until The Works Tour eight years later.

In September 2016 it was the opening song of the set at the first performance of Queen + Adam Lambert's tour of Asia in Tel Aviv's Park HaYarkon in Israel.

Personnel
Instrumental Version 
Freddie Mercury – piano
Brian May – electric guitar
Roger Taylor – drums, percussion
John Deacon – bass guitar

Vocal version

Queen
Freddie Mercury – lead and backing vocals, piano
Brian May – electric guitar, backing vocals
Roger Taylor – drums, gong, tambourine, percussion, backing vocals
John Deacon – bass guitar

Guest musician
Roy Thomas Baker – stylophone

Certifications

Notes

References

External links
 
 Queenpedia – detailed worldwide release information
 [ "Seven Seas of Rhye" Song Review] at Allmusic

Songs about oceans and seas
1973 songs
1974 singles
Queen (band) songs
Songs written by Freddie Mercury
Song recordings produced by Roy Thomas Baker
EMI Records singles
Elektra Records singles
Hollywood Records singles
British hard rock songs